Ahsan Baig (born 2 October 1988) is a Pakistani cricketer. He made his first-class debut for Multan in the 2010–11 Quaid-e-Azam Trophy on 4 November 2010.

References

External links
 

1988 births
Living people
Pakistani cricketers
Multan cricketers
Place of birth missing (living people)